Joseph Michaud (June 13, 1857 – September 24, 1913) was a Canadian politician, who represented the electoral district of Nipissing West in the Legislative Assembly of Ontario from 1902 to 1904.

Michaud was born in 1857. A member of the Liberal Party, he was elected in the 1902 election. He died in 1913.

References

External links
 

1857 births
Franco-Ontarian people
Ontario Liberal Party MPPs
People from West Nipissing
1913 deaths